Le Temps is a Swiss French-language daily newspaper published in Berliner format in Geneva by Le Temps SA. It is the sole nationwide French-language non-specialised daily newspaper of Switzerland. Since 2021, it has been owned by Fondation Aventinus, a not-for-profit organisation.

According to the Research Department on Public Opinion and Society (FÖG) of the University of Zurich, it is of "high quality".

History and profile 
First published on 18 March 1998, it is the result of the merger of three major newspapers from the Lake Geneva region: the Journal de Genève, Gazette de Lausanne and Le Nouveau Quotidien. Previously owned by Ringier, it has been majority-owned by the not-for-profit Fondation Aventinus (95.5%). The remaining shares are held by the Groupe Le Monde (2.1%) and the employee-owned Société des rédacteurs et du personnel du Temps SA (2.4%).

, the newspaper had around 120 employees, spread across newsrooms in Geneva, Lausanne, Bern, Neuchâtel and Sion, as well as relying upon the work of freelance journalists around the world.

Published Monday through Saturday, the newspaper has several supplements (Friday: "Carrières" job and management; Saturday: "Samedi culturel" and special features for the week-end; monthly "Sortir" cultural diary), thematic special editions, a website and digital applications.

Le Temps has an advertising agency, Le Temps Media (Publicitas).

The circulation of Le Temps was 45,970 copies in 2006. Its circulation was 45,506 copies in 2009. In 2013 the paper had a paid circulation of 36,391 copies.

Editors-in-chief
The newspaper's former and current editors-in-chief are:
 Eric Hoesli, from 1998 to 2002.
 Jean-Jacques Roth, from 2002 to 2010.
 Pierre Veya, from 2010 to 2015.
 Stéphane Benoit-Godet, from 2015 to 2020 
 Madeleine von Holzen, from 2021 to present

Collaborations
The newspaper collaborates editorially with newsrooms around the world, including Le Courrier International, Le Monde, Le Soir and La Tribune.

It shares advertising pools with the Neue Zürcher Zeitung and Le Monde.

Archives 
Le Temps digitalised the archives of its three predecessors:

 Gazette de Lausanne (1798-1991)
 Journal de Genève (1826–1991)
 Journal de Genève et gazette de Lausanne (1991–1998)
 Le nouveau quotidien (1991–1998)

With assistance of the Swiss National Library and regional libraries, the publisher offers 200 years of independent Swiss press, available on the internet at www.letempsarchives.ch.

See also 
 List of newspapers in Switzerland

Notes and references

External links 

 Official website 

1998 establishments in Switzerland
Newspapers established in 1998
Daily newspapers published in Switzerland
French-language newspapers published in Switzerland
Swiss news websites
Newspapers published in Geneva